The first Dombrovskis cabinet was the government of Latvia from 12 March 2009 to 3 November 2010.  It was the first government to be led by Valdis Dombrovskis, who was Prime Minister from 2009 until 2014.  It took office on 12 March 2009, after the resignation of Ivars Godmanis, succeeding the second Godmanis cabinet, which had lasted from 2007 to 2009.  It was replaced by the second Dombrovskis cabinet on 3 November 2010, after the October 2010 election.

Government of Latvia
2009 establishments in Latvia
2010 disestablishments in Latvia
Cabinets established in 2009
Cabinets disestablished in 2010